Valitovo (Wälit) is a rural locality (a village) in Yalchinsky Selsoviet, Kugarchinsky District, Bashkortostan, Russia. The population was 74 as of 2010. There are 2 streets.

Geography 
Valitovo is located 40 km northwest of Mrakovo (the district's administrative centre) by road. Nizhnesapashevo is the nearest rural locality.

References 

Rural localities in Kugarchinsky District